'Four' & More: Recorded Live in Concert is a live album by Miles Davis, recorded at the Philharmonic Hall of Lincoln Center, New York City, NY on February 12, 1964, but not released until 1966. Two albums were assembled from the concert recording: the up-tempo pieces were issued on this album, while My Funny Valentine consists of the slow and medium-tempo numbers.

Track listing

Original LP Track listing

Side 1
 "So What" (Miles Davis) – 9:10
 "Walkin'" (Richard Henry Carpenter) – 8:06
 "Joshua/Go-Go (Theme and Announcement)" (Victor Feldman) – 11:14

Side 2
 "Four" (Davis) – 6:18
 "Seven Steps to Heaven" (Feldman, Davis) – 7:51
 "There Is No Greater Love/Go-Go (Theme and Announcement)" (Marty Symes, Isham Jones) – 11:23

Reissue CD (COL 519505 2, 2005)
 "So What" (Miles Davis) – 9:10
 "Walkin'" (Richard Henry Carpenter) – 8:07
 "Joshua" (Victor Feldman) – 9:32
 "Go-Go (Theme and Announcement)" (Davis) – 1:44
 "Four" (Davis) – 6:28
 "Seven Steps to Heaven" (Feldman, Davis) – 7:46
 "There Is No Greater Love" (Marty Symes, Isham Jones) – 10:02
 "Go-Go (Theme and Announcement)" (Davis) – 1:21

Personnel
 Miles Davis — trumpet
 George Coleman — tenor saxophone
 Herbie Hancock — piano
 Ron Carter — double bass
 Tony Williams — drums

Production

Original LP
 Producer — Teo Macero
 Recording Engineer — Fred Plaut
 Cover Photography — Jim Marshall
 Liner Notes — Billy Taylor, Mort Fega

Reissue CD (COL 519505 2, 2005)
 Reissue Producer — Michael Cuscuna and Bob Belden
 Remixed and Mastered — Mark Wilder at Sony Music Studios, New York, NY.
 Project Director — Seth Rothstein
 Legacy A&R — Steve Berkowitz
 A&R Coordination — Stacey Boyle
 Reissue Art Direction — Howard Fritzson
 Reissue Design — Randall Martin
 Photography — Jim Marshall, Jan Perrson, Francis Wolff, Chuck Stewart, Vernon Smith
 Packaging Manager — John Conroy
 Liner Note — John Ephland

References 

Albums produced by Teo Macero
Miles Davis live albums
1966 live albums
Columbia Records live albums
Albums recorded at the Lincoln Center for the Performing Arts

fr:Miles Davis Quintet, Philharmonic Hall at Lincoln Center, New-York City, 12 février 1964
pl:The Complete Concert 1964: My Funny Valentine + Four & More